Remineralisation (UK spelling; US remineralization) is the transformation of organic molecules to inorganic forms.

Remineralisation may also refer to:

 Bone remodeling (bone metabolism)
 Remineralisation of teeth
 Rockdust, also known as soil remineralization when applied as a nonsynthetic organic fertilizer
 See also John D. Hamaker § Remineralization benefits

See also 
 Demineralisation
 Mineralization (disambiguation)